Betsy is the self-titled debut studio album by Welsh singer-songwriter Betsy. It was released by Warner Bros. Records on 29 September 2017.

Background
After completing a course in fashion design in Central St Martins and working at Balenciaga in Paris, Betsy returned to the United Kingdom to pursue her dream of becoming a musician. She self-produced a three-track demo EP which later secured her a management deal. Betsy retreated to her brother's caravan for two months to write songs, a number of which appear on her debut album. In addition to her own self-written songs, she also worked with producers such as Jim Eliot, Sak Pase and Jack McManus on some of the album's tracks.

Release
Although initially scheduled to be released on 26 May 2017, the album was later pushed back to 29 September. Betsy revealed the release date with the digital pre-order on 30 June.  The album artwork and tracklisting were subsequently revealed on 18 August.

Promotion

Singles
"Fair" was released as the album's first - and Betsy's debut - single on 22 January 2016. "Lost & Found" followed as the second single on 5 August 2016, and Betsy appeared on the cover of Spotify's New Music Friday playlist in the UK to promote the single's release. On 4 November 2016, "Wanted More" was released as the third single from the album, and "Waiting" followed as the fourth single on 27 January 2017. "Little White Lies" was released as the album's fifth - and to date, final - single on 2 June 2017.

Promotional singles
"You Won't Love Me" served as an instant gratification track with the album pre-order, and was released on 25 August 2017. "Heavy Head" was confirmed to be the album's second promotional single in November 2017 when she performed the track on the BBC's Children in Need appeal show in Wales. A Kat Krazy remix of the song was released on 8 December 2017.

Track listing

Personnel
Credits adapted from AllMusic.

Musicians

 Betsy – vocals, production, keyboards
 Tim Woodcock – background vocals
 Blue May – vocal producer 
 Simon Elms – trumpet, flugelhorn
 Geoff Holroyde – drums
 Andy Brown – conductor
 Robin Mullarkey – bass
 Rob Malarkey – bass
 London Metropolitan Orchestra – strings, orchestra
 Tim Baxter – strings, orchestration 
 Izzi Dunn – strings, orchestration
 Jessica Dannheiser – orchestration 
 Jonas Quant – strings
 Colin Smith – saxophone
 Jack McManus – piano, keyboards, backing vocals
 Matt Johnson – piano
 Peter Jarrett – piano, percussion, keyboards
 Alex Reeves – additional drums

Technical
 Alexander Burnett – production, programming
 Blue May – production, engineering
 Dreamtrak – production, programming
 Jack McManus – production, programming
 Jim Eliot – production
 Jonas Quant – production, programming
 Mark Ralph – production, mixing
 Peter Jarrett – production, additional production, programming
 Hal Ritson – programming
 Richard Adlam – programming
 Jay Reynolds – additional production
 Oliver Wright – additional production, mixing
 BiLLLy – programming
 Drew Smith – engineering
 Izzi Dunn – engineering
 Robbie Nelson – engineering
 SAK PASE – production
 Sean and Seng – photography
 Betsy – art direction, production 
 Mat Maitland – art direction, design
 Drew Smith – mixing, engineering
 Tom Ad Fuller – mixing
 John Davis – mastering

Charts

References

External links

2017 albums
Warner Records albums